Pyrrhus and Cineas (original title: Pyrrhus et Cinéas) is Simone de Beauvoir's first philosophical essay. It was published in 1944, and in it, she makes a philosophical inquiry into the human situation by way of analogy from the story of when Pyrrhus was asked by his friend Cineas what his plans were after conquering his next empire. Cineas's question is a sort of infinite regress ("and then what?") that only stops when Pyrrhus admits that after the last conquest, he will rest. Upon receiving this answer, Cineas asks why Pyrrhus doesn't rest now instead of going through all the trouble of conquering all these other empires when the final result will be rest anyway.

According to Beauvoir, Cineas's question haunts all of our projects, and we will always have to give an answer to it. The authentic answer, as she sees it, goes contrary to traditional interpretations in which Cineas is considered the wiser of the two. Pyrrhus's attitude is considered more authentic in that it is an attitude that directs itself forwards towards goals that are never absolute: According to Beauvoir, the reason for Pyrrhus's final statement that in the end, he is going to rest, is that he lacks imagination.

References

1944 essays
Essays by Simone de Beauvoir
Pyrrhus of Epirus
Philosophy essays